John Francis Sheridan (1843 – 26 December 1908) was an Irish-American comic actor and female impersonator who had a long career in Australia, mostly in burlesque.

History 
Sheridan was born in America and got his start on the stage at Providence, Rhode Island in pantomime as a widow named Mulvaney. 
His best-known character was "Widow O'Brien" in Fun on the Bristol, a musical farce written by George Fawcett Rowe, and first produced at Newport, Rhode Island, but was heavily criticised. It was developed by E. E. Rice in New York, finally making 14th Street theatres in 1880, and was taken to London just as Nellie Stewart's Rainbow Revels was opening at the same theatre. 
Sheridan and his play were brought to Australia in 1884 by Williamson, Garner, and Musgrove. Later successes include the opera The Earl and the Girl, in which he was associated with Miss Heba Harlow, also A Trip to Chicago (written jointly by Sheridan and Fred Lyster), as "Johanna Murphy" and Dion Boucicault's The Shaughraun.

He died of heart failure in the early hours of Boxing Day at the Criterion Hotel, Newcastle, in which city he was due to appear in Cinderella for William Anderson that night. He had been suffering poor health for a long period, and had recently lost a fortune when a financial institution, in which he had invested heavily, failed. His remains were interred in the Waverley Cemetery.

Publications 
John F. Sheridan's Songster aka John F. Sheridan's New Song Book (1900-1909)
Uncle Tom's Cabin (1886), musical theatre by Alfred Dampier, John F. Sheridan with H. Percy Kehoe and J. A. Robertson (composers.
Black-Eyed Susan, or, The Lass Who Loved William (1890), musical theatre by John F. Sheridan and Bert Royle, J. A. Robertson (composer), Macmahon Brothers , F. E. Hiscocks , W. J. Wilson
Fun on the Bristol, or, A Night on the Sound (1879) George Fawcett Rowe, John F. Sheridan
The New Barmaid (1895–1908), musical theatre by John F. Sheridan

References 

1850 births
1908 deaths
19th-century Australian male actors